Atawallpa (Aymara for hen, Hispanicized spelling Atahualpa) is a mountain in the Andes of Peru, about  high. It is located in the Cusco Region, Espinar Province, on the border of the districts of Condoroma and Ocoruro. The mountain northwest of it is Atawallpa Much'u ("hen's little child"). Atawallpa lies at a lake named Wallatani ("the one with the Andean goose", Hispanicized Guallatane).

References

Mountains of Peru
Mountains of Cusco Region